Glenn Gingell (born 16 May 1953) is  a former Australian rules footballer who played with Footscray in the Victorian Football League (VFL).	

After leaving Footscray, Gingell played two seasons with Brunswick (VFA).

Notes

External links 
		

Living people
1953 births
Australian rules footballers from Victoria (Australia)
Western Bulldogs players
Brunswick Football Club players